Li Jue may refer to:

Li Jue (Han Dynasty) (died 198), general of the Han Dynasty
 Li Jue (Tang Dynasty) (c. 784–852), chancellor of the Tang Dynasty
Li Jue (Kuomintang) (1900–1987), general of the Republic of China